The autism-spectrum quotient (AQ) is a questionnaire published in 2001 by Simon Baron-Cohen and his colleagues at the Autism Research Centre in Cambridge, UK. Consisting of fifty questions, it aims to investigate whether adults of average intelligence have symptoms of autism spectrum conditions. More recently, versions of the AQ for children and adolescents have also been published.

The test was popularised by Wired in  when published alongside their article, "The Geek Syndrome". It is commonly used for self diagnosis of autism spectrum disorders, although it is not intended to be a diagnostic test. The PhenX Toolkit uses age-specific versions of AQ as its adult and adolescent screening protocols for Symptoms of Autism Spectrum Disorders.

Format 
The test consists of 50 statements, each of which is in a forced choice format. Each question allows the subject to indicate "definitely agree", "slightly agree", "slightly disagree" or "definitely disagree". Approximately half the questions are worded to elicit an "agree" response from neurotypical individuals, and half to elicit a "disagree" response. The subject scores one point for each question which is answered "autistically" either slightly or definitely.

The questions cover five different domains associated with the autism spectrum: social skills; communication skills; imagination; attention to detail; and attention switching/tolerance of change. Factor analysis of sample results have been inconsistent, with various studies finding two, three or four factors instead of five.

Use as a diagnostic tool 
In the initial trials of the test, the average score in the control group was 16.4, with men scoring slightly higher than women (about 17 versus about 15). 80% of adults diagnosed with autism spectrum disorders scored 32 or more, compared with only 2% of the control group.

The authors cited a score of 32 or more as indicating "clinically significant levels of autistic traits". However, although the test is popularly used for self-diagnosis of autism spectrum disorders, the authors caution that it is not intended to be diagnostic, and advise that anyone who obtains a high score and is suffering some distress should seek professional medical advice and not jump to any conclusions.

A further research paper indicated that the questionnaire could be used for screening in clinical practice, with scores less than 26 indicating that a diagnosis of Asperger syndrome can effectively be ruled out.

It is also often used to assess milder variants of autistic-like traits in neurotypical individuals.

Mathematicians, scientists and engineers 
Although most students with an autism spectrum disorder have average mathematical ability and test slightly worse in mathematics than in general intelligence, some are gifted in mathematics and autism spectrum disorder has not prevented adults from major accomplishments.

The questionnaire was tried on Cambridge University students and a group of 16 winners of the British Mathematical Olympiad to determine whether there was a link between a talent for mathematical and scientific disciplines and traits associated with the autism spectrum. Mathematics, physical sciences, and engineering students were found to score significantly higher, e.g., 21.8 on average for mathematicians and 21.4 for computer scientists. The average score for the British Mathematical Olympiad winners was 24.

See also 
 List of diagnostic classification and rating scales used in psychiatry
 Psychological testing
 Psychometrics

References 

 Taylor et al. 2020, "Psychometric concerns with the 10-item Autism-Spectrum Quotient (AQ10) as a measure of trait autism in the general population"

External links 
 Online version of the AQ questionnaire

Autism screening and assessment tools